Streptomyces albiaxialis is a halotolerant bacterium species from the genus  of Streptomyces which has been isolated from an oil field in Russia.

See also 
 List of Streptomyces species

References

Further reading

External links
Type strain of Streptomyces albiaxialis at BacDive -  the Bacterial Diversity Metadatabase

albiaxialis
Bacteria described in 1993